Wang Hao (born August 16, 1989, in Inner Mongolia) is a Chinese race walker.

Biography
In August 2008 he finished fourth in the 20 km race walk event at the 2008 Summer Olympics, in a new personal best time of 1:19:47 hours. He missed out on the bronze medal by a margin of five seconds.

On 23 October 2008 he set a new world junior record over 10 km walk, with 39:32 minutes. The previous record of 39:57 minutes was set by Aleksey Bartsaykin of Russia earlier in 2008.

On August 15, 2009, he won the silver medal at the 20 kilometres walk in the 2009 World Championships in Berlin, setting a personal best of 1:19:06 in the process. By winning silver in the 20 km walk, Wang Hao became China's third ever male athlete to win a medal in the history of the IAAF World Championships, after former men's high jump world record holder Zhu Jianhua, who won bronze in the 1983 World Championships, and hurdler Liu Xiang, who won a bronze in 2003, silver in 2005 and gold in 2007.

He won two medals at the 11th Chinese National Games in 2009: a gold in the 20 km walk and a silver in the 50 km walk, finishing behind Zhao Chengliang in the latter event.

See also
China at the World Championships in Athletics

References
 

1989 births
Living people
Athletes (track and field) at the 2008 Summer Olympics
Chinese male racewalkers
Olympic athletes of China
Athletes from Inner Mongolia
Asian Games medalists in athletics (track and field)
World Athletics Championships medalists
Athletes (track and field) at the 2010 Asian Games
Asian Games gold medalists for China
Medalists at the 2010 Asian Games
World Athletics Race Walking Team Championships winners
World Athletics Championships winners